Solan is a city in the Indian state of Himachal Pradesh and the district headquarters of Solan district. The city is situated between Chandigarh (joint capital of Punjab and Haryana) and Shimla (state capital) on the Kalka-Shimla National Highway-5. The narrow-gauge Kalka-Shimla railway passes through Solan. Located on the Punjab-Himachal Border, Solan is nestled in the Shivalik hills of the Himalayas.

Solan was originally the capital of the princely state, Baghat. A defining feature of Solan, is its ancient temples and monasteries. The Shoolini Mata Temple and Jatoli Shiv Temple are popular attractions for tourists. One of the most famous monasteries in this region is the Yundung Monastery. The hill-town is named after the Hindu goddess Shoolini Devi ~ who is a manifestation of Goddess Durga in Her warrior aspect. Shoolini, when translated literally, means 'the goddess wielding the spear'. Every year in June, a fair venerating the Goddess is held, featuring a 3-day melā at the central Thodo ground.

Solan is known for the production of quality mushrooms, as a result of the vast mushroom farming in the area, as well as the Directorate of Mushroom Research (DMR) situated at Chambaghat. Due to this fact, Solan is also known as the "Mushroom City of India". Solan is also called the "City of Red Gold", due to the bulk production of tomatoes in the area.

The city has one of the oldest breweries in the country, and also has a 300-year-old fort located at the top of a hill.

Historical evolution
The history of Solan goes back to the era of Pandavas. According to local folklore, Pandavas lived here during their exile.  In 1815, British won Baghat state (now Solan) from the Gurkhas. Gurkha fort, or Arki Fort, is still standing tall on a mountain near to the city of Solan, and it is one of the historic tourist attractions of Solan. The town has been a capital of the princely Baghat State. The word Baghat is derived from Bau, or Bahu, meaning "many", and Ghat, meaning "pass". Initially, the state headquarters of the Baghat State was located at Bhoch in the Bhuchali pargana. The headquarters of the state was shifted to Solan, after the construction of cantonment in the city; the railway was set up in 1902. The evolution of Solan city can be understood in the following order or sequence:
Establishment of a cantonment area at Solan by Brits.
Establishing a brewery in Solan in 1855, due to availability of excellent quality mineral water.
Shifting of the headquarters of Baghat State from Bhoch to Solan.
Start of Kalka-Shimla rail line in 1902.
Start of transportation activity on Kalka-Solan-Shimla road.
The urban local body, i.e. Municipal Council Solan, came into existence in 1950.
 Solan became an independent district on 1 September 1972, and the town of Solan became the district headquarters.

Heritage
Solan's history is intertwined with that of the erstwhile princely state of Baghat. The Solan cantonment is still the best, and the most well planned part of the area, hence buildings are made in a planned manner. The church in Solan cantonment is a heritage building, with wooden and stone carvings. It has sloping roofs and arches, reminiscent of British architecture.

The list of heritage buildings in Solan town is as follows:-
Shoolini Devi temple.

The Church in Solan cantonment.
The Solan railway station.
The Barog railway station.
Hari Mandir, a famous Lord Krishna temple.
The railway station and the railway rest house at Salogra.
The DC residence on Shilly road.
Anees villa, ancestral home of Salman Rushdie Shilly road near DC residence.
S.E., PWD office which used to be a durbar hall of Baghat State.
Old guest house in the palace of Baghat state.
Khalifa lodge (now the JBT college running in it).
Kishan Niwas and Hill View on circular road.
St. Luke's Sen Sec School; the school built on a hill.
Jatoli Temple (5 km. far from Solan on Rajgarh Road).

Mohan Shakti National Heritage Park (in Hart, 12 km from Solan)
Mohan Meakin Limited – Mohan Meakin is a large group of companies, which started with Asia's first brewery incorporated in 1855
Dolanji Bon Monastery, Solan.
Dr. Yashwant Singh Parmar University of Horticulture and Forestry
The Palace near Palace Road.
Pandavas cave at Mount Karol, Chambaghat, Solan

Geography
It has an average elevation of 1502 metres (5249.34 feet). The highest point is atop Mount Karol, at 2280 metres. Pandava's cave, where Pandavas believed to have meditated during their 12-year exile, is located at the mountain top. Solan gets occasional snowfall during winters.

Solan is a base station for the nearby tourist destinations, including Chail, Dagshai, Sabathu, Kandaghat, Kasauli, Rajgarh, Salogra and Churdhar peak.

Climate
Situated at an altitude of 1600 metres on an average, Solan can be considered an average temperature hill station. That is why it is considered as an ideal station, from a residential point of view. During winters, Solan experiences light snowfall.

Nagar Nigam and District administration
Municipal Corporation Solan is spread over an area of 33.43 km2  with a residential population of 39,256. It is the 3rd largest Municipal Corporation of Himachal Pradesh.

District administration and Centre Government offices
Being the district headquarters the city is the seat of district administration having offices in government buildings. There are:
Mini Secretariat at byepass containing D.C. Office, S.P. Office, SDM Office, NIC, DYSSO, District Statistical Office, D.R.O., Copying Agency, DRDA, Zila Parishad, District Treasury office, ASP, DSP, DF&SC etc.
PWD circle office near hospital on tank road. It houses the office of S.E., HP PWD, Solan circle.
Public Works Department complex on Solan bye pass. It has offices of Executive Engineer (National Highways), Executive Engineer, HP PWD Solan Division, Assistant Engineer Horticulture Sub Division etc.
District Industries Centre at Chambaghat. It has offices of GM, Industries and Mining officer.
Tehsil Office at Kotla Nallah on Rajgarh road.
District Public Relations Office near Gurudwara at Saproon.
Town & Country Planning Office near Dohri Dwar on Barog Bye-pass.
XEN, Public & Health office near Dohri Dwar on Barog bye pass.
Deputy Director, Animal Husbandry on Jaunaji road
District Agriculture office & District Horticulture office at Chambaghat.
Chief Medical Officer's Office at Chambaghat.
District Education Office (Primary & Secondary) at Chambaghat.
Offices of HPSEB near Power House at Saproon.
District Courts on the Mall road near Saproon.

A number of Central Govt. Offices too have their own departmental buildings.
Ministry of MSME, Govt. of India
N.R.C.M. (National Research Centre for Mushroom)
C.I.P.M.C. (Centre for Investigation of Pest Management & Control)
Z.S.I. (Zoological Survey of India)
E.T.D.C. (Electronics Testing and Development Centre)

Demographics
According to the 2011 Indian census, Solan has a population of 39,256, making it the second largest city in Himachal, after Shimla. Solan had an average literacy rate of 85.02%.

Solan is a Municipal Council city. It is divided into 17 wards for which elections are held every 5 years. The Solan Municipal Council has population of 39,256, of which 21,182 are males, while 18,074 are females, as per report released by Census India 2011.

Population of children with age of 0–6 is 3,524, which is 8.98% of the total population of Solan (M Cl). In Solan Municipal Council, the female sex ratio is of 8:53, against state average of 9:72. Moreover, child age ratio in Solan is around 886, compared to Himachal Pradesh state average of 909. Literacy rate of Solan city is 93.02% higher than the state average of 82.80%. In Solan, male literacy is around 94.01%, while female literacy rate is 91.86%.

Solan Municipal Council has total administration over 9,803 houses, to which it supplies basic amenities, like water and sewerage.

Solan Work Profile
Out of total population, 15,640 were engaged in work or business activity. Of this 12,147 were males, while 3,493 were females. In census surveys, 'worker' is defined as a person who does business, jobs, services, cultivation, and labour activity for profit. Of total 15,640 working population, 93.31% were engaged in main work, while 6.69% of total workers were engaged in marginal work.

'

City area
Solan Planning Area covers 3,343 hectares = 33.43 km2 of land (2nd Largest city area in Himachal Pradesh).

Economy
Solan is a hub of horticulture produce marketing. Tomatoes, plums, apricots, kiwi, apples, and seasonal vegetables constitutes major economic activity for the town. There is a large complex on Saproon bypass, which houses a vegetables and fruits market.

Mushrooms are widely grown in town, and contribute to the economy of the inhabitants.

Tourism contributes to the economy of Solan.

Solan is also developing as an education hub of Himachal Pradesh, with many established technical institutions giving employment to people of the town.

People from other places visit Solan to use the health, educational, commercial and other infrastructure available. They contribute in the economy of the city.

Industry

Solan is an industrial hub of Himachal Pradesh. It is also known for its pharmaceutical industry. The small-scale and medium industrial units provide employment, and play a role in the economy of the inhabitants of Solan.

These industrial units mainly belong to hosiery, food, wood, paper, leather, glass, chemical, mechanical, pharmaceuticals, food processing, electrical, and electronics services.

The following major units are operating in town:-
BIG STORY*- Digital News Channel & Newspaper
 H.F.C.L. (Himachal Futuristic Communications Limited)
Exicom ( a sister concern of HFCL)
Himalayan Pipe Factory
Shivalik Bi-Metal
Decora Iron & Steel Industry.
Mohan Meakins Breweries.
Meridian group of companies
TQM World Institution of Quality Excellence, provides training & consulting for the Quality Improvement of MSMEs.
Prime Kreation, provides services in website designing, development, digital marketing etc.
Xchanging Technology Limited, this is an Information Technology Company is the only UK based MNC which exists in the Town and is the largest corporate employer in the region.
First Verdict Media-A Newspaper and News/Media Agency from Solan
Sentiss Pharma
Service industry has also come up in town to cater to urban and rural population. The major services provided are computer and internet based services, tourism, travel and ticketing, taxi operations, beauty and grooming,  mobile servicing, food and fashion.

Culture

Salwar suit is the main ethnic wear all over Solan District. Other common dresses are also worn by ladies, whereas men have no specific traditional dress. Ghaghra choli is a traditional dress for women in Solan. However, it is not as common, and it can be seen only during specific cultural dance events.

When it comes to traditional ornaments, women wear 9 Ladi Haar (a nine-strand necklace), Chaak (a golden ornament worn on the head), and gajru (heavy silver bracelets).

Pahari giddha, or paruhan, is the traditional dance of the Solan district. This dance is originally from Kunihar, a small town in the Solan district, which can be considered a cultural village of the Solan district. This dance is performed by group of women, to fast-paced traditional songs.

A historical dance, called Thoda, is also performed during the Shoolini melā every year in the month of June. The Thoda dance is a dance performed based on archery; bows and arrows are used in this dance.

People also perform Nati, which is the traditional dance form of most of the Himachalis. People wear the cultural outfits rejta and dhaatu while performing Nati.

Food
Himachali people believe in Atithi Devo Bhava code of conduct. They practice hospitality; inviting an acquaintance, or even a stranger, into their home is a way of life. The host will offer whatever food is available in the house, here a general belief is: 'a guest should not leave without eating'.

Cuisines of Solan are spicy, so grab a glass of water before you start eating. The preferred food in Solan mainly consists of vegetarian food, with a generous dose of spices like cardamom, cinnamon, cloves and red chillies. The average cuisine churns out all sorts of lentil and cereals for tasty preparations.
While an everyday meal typically consists of dal-chawal-subzi-roti (the common north Indian meal of rice, lentil broth, dishes of seasonal vegetables, cereals and sorted bread), special dishes are usually prepared on celebratory occasions, such as festivals, weddings, seasonal holidays, and fairs.  

Some of the traditional dishes are as below:
Poode, made from a batter of wheat and jaggery syrup (gud), which is then shallow fried in ghee, or oil.
Lushke, made from wheat, rice flour with little baking soda, and is similar to a pancake.
Patande, another dish of Solan and Sirmaur districts of the state. Patande is made from wheat and is similar to a pancake as well.
Sidu, a kind of bread made from wheat flour stuffed with dal and spices. It is kneaded with yeast, and the dough is set to rise for 4–5 hours. With a stuffing of fat, it is first browned over a slow fire, and then steamed. Sidu is normally eaten with ghee.
Askalu, made from wheat, rice flour with a small amount of baking soda. The batter is put into a special utensil made from stone called askali, which contains several small molds in it.
Pachole, a seasonal dish made from mashed sweet corns with spices, which is then steamed and eaten with ghee.

Flora and fauna
The Solan planning area contains Chil, Ban, and Kail, mainly deodar cedar and pine trees in the city. Oak forests are also at higher elevations around moist locations. Places like Chail is the most predominant one for different species of vegetation. Besides the indigenous vegetation, there are ornamental and alien plantations too. It consists of silver oak, jhakranda, bottle brush, weeping willows, kachnar, grasses, etc.

Due to variations in altitude, there is a variety of fauna in the region. The Himalayan black bear & panther are the carnivores typically found in the area, whereas the Ghoral and the barking deer are the herbivores, found in and around the Solan planning area. Other animals include the jackal, mongoose, the Jangli Billi, monkeys & langurs, etc. Game birds include jungli murga, kabutar, ghughi, dhaula teetar and kolsa etc.

Tourism and other attractions

Places of tourist Interest

There are many places of interest in and around Solan.
Maa Shoolini Devi temple on Shilly Road
Jatoli Temple on Rajgarh Road
Children's park on Mall Road
20 mins away is internationally awarded Yogananda Library at Shoolini University
Jawahar Park on top of a hill. The whole of the town can be viewed from here.
Mohan Meakin Breweries the oldest distillery in India and one of the oldest in the world.
Toy train and Solan railway station on Kalka-Shimla railway narrow gauge. It is a UNESCO World Heritage site.
Karol ka Tibba
Badi ki dhar Badi Dhar is situated at an altitude of 6781 feet above sea level. Beautiful sights of Shimla can be seen from the top of the hill. The place is famous for its Lord Shiva temple and annual fair which is organized on 14/15 June.
Mohan Shakti National Heritage Park
Water tanks on tank road
Forest nursery area
Dr. Yashwant Singh Parmar University of Horticulture and Forestry
Barog railway station
Kasauli
Chail
Giripul and Gauda
Bon Monastery, Dolanji
Water Park and Cafe at Sadhupul
City Fashion- Lakkar Bazar Solan. One of the most famous Fashion Boutique.
Mithoo's- Upper Bazar Solan. One of the oldest and most favorite clothing showroom in Solan.

Solan is fast developing into a tourist spot. It is also known as a reference station for tourists visiting nearby places. Included in that category are Chail, Kasauli, Dagshai, Sabathu, Kandaghat, Churdhar Peak etc. Many visitors going to Shimla, Kinnaur & other areas of the state use this town as a halting station. The tourism infrastructure includes dozens of hotels catering to the needs of budget and luxury tourists.

Besides the Dr. Yashwant Singh Parmar University of Horticulture and Forestry at Nauni, other places of interest in Solan include the Maa Shoolini temple, the Jatoli Shiv temple, and the Bon Monastery, Dolanji, which is approximately 3 km from Oachghat.

A tourist information office is functioning at Solan. It may soon have a few tourist minibusses so that sightseeing tours could be arranged to Dagshai, Kasauli, Sabathu, Chail, Giripul and other places of tourist interest.

The Solan Hills stand on the water – parting between the Sutlej and the Giri, a tributary of the Yamuna.

South of Solan is the Panchmunda ridge which is crossed by a railway through a tunnel (the longest on the Kalka – Shimla run) at Barog railway station, where a series of fissure give rise to springs at its flank.

The first ridge above Kalka rises abruptly to pineclad Kasauli at a height of 1927 meters and is joined by a 12 km bridle path for trekking. The distance by road, however, from Kalka is 36.5 km.

The town of Kasauli is a hill-station for spending holidays and is a honeymoon destination with the temple devoted to the Hindu god Shiva. It is also home to Army and Air Force base. At Monkey Point there is a temple of Hanuman. This is one of the small towns developed by the British during the 'heyday' of the empire. It can be reached by a branch road on the Kalka-Shimla road, near Dharampur.

The upper and lower Malls are the two principal roads that run along the length of Kasauli, a thick cover of pine, oak, rhododendron, and horse chestnut trees that embrace the entire area. Traffic is restricted on these roads, which is the reason why Kasauli is the quietest hill station in India. The resort's colonial aura is underlined by gabled houses with cobbled alleys and rows of orchards and gardens.

Kasauli has The Central Research Institute (CRI), set up in 1905, is the oldest in India. The institute manufactures vaccines, antisera, dead emulsion, bacterial diagnostic reagents, and normal horse serum and blood

At 3647 mt, the Churdhar Peak, looms over the sylvan surroundings, and just across these ranges, is Shimla town.

This region has also been witness to Gurkha expansion at Sabathu and to ruins of old Gurkha Fort, a three-hundred-year-old Gurkha fort at Nauni, which dates back to the time when the region was ruled by the Gurkhas of Nepal. Though the fort is in ruins, but it is strategically located atop a mountain point providing a panoramic view of the entire area.

The proposed ropeway between Chambaghat and Karol is expected to contribute more to the tourism industry of the town.

Mohan Shakti National Heritage Park spreads over 40 acres of land at a cost of Rs 454 crore on the right bank of river Ashwani. It lies in 'Hart Village' which takes a detour of around 6 km from the main highway after Salogra.
Elaborating on the concept of Heritage Park, Brig Kapil Mohan, chairman of Mohan Shakti Trust who has undertaken the Heritage Park project, said that it would be a center of learning and would generate sufficient inquisitiveness into the minds of people all over the world for Indian philosophy and ancient heritage. At the center of the park, is a grand temple where a magnificent collection of statues of gods and goddesses are installed. Besides, an ancient Indian research center is proposed for studying Indian Heritage and eminent scholars would be associated with it.
the project consists of following salient features

Big temples with exquisite architectural marvels.
Meditation center inside a cave.
Theme park.
Herbal Plantations.
Fountains and landscaped gardens.
Ropeway trolley.
Research Centre.
Ayurvedic healing.
Yagyashala etc. etc.

Also, the park would have an auditorium facility provided with laser shows based on Indian mythology and epics of Mahabharata and Ramayana.

Playgrounds and parks
The town has three parks. These are:
 Jawahar Park – Located at the highest point of the town proper, it has fountains, rides, baby train, small playfield, etc.
 Children Park – Located on the Mall road itself near DC Office, it has animal rides, rides, musical fountain & a cafe, etc.

 Mohan Park – Built by Mohan Meakins breweries near Chambaghat on the Mall road, it has a terrace garden, rides, etc.
 Subhash Chandra Bose Park – Hospital road Solan.
There are following grounds in the town:-
 Thodo ground – Near MC Office, it is the center of all cultural, official & sports activities.
 Police ground – Adjoining Police lines at Kather it is an upcoming ground & has the potential of the making of a stadium. It is the training ground of Solan policemen.
 Radhaswami Satsang – A large ground at Anji.

The town has a number of community halls. Some hotels nearby also have excellent facilities for arranging marriages, functions, meetings or parties. There are religious institutions too offering such facilities. MC Solan has its own community hall near Thodo ground.

For recreation and outing, there are two movie theaters and many fast food joints, restaurants, and bars.

Accessibility

The National Highway No. 22 is a prominent road passing through Solan town. It is an important road from many points of view. Firstly it is a defense road connecting Delhi, Dehradun, Ambala, and Chandigarh to the China Border. Next, it is the lifeline of the State as it is the main road for all imports and exports in the state. It is on account of its significance that there are 2 bypasses within Solan Planning Area. These are :
Solan bypass linking Saproon and Chambaghat.
Barog bypass linking Saproon and Kumarhatti via Anji & Rabon. The NHAI has undertaken the 4-laning of this road. Work is under progress.
Besides N.H.-22, Solan has many other important roads connecting Solan to its nearby areas, towns, or settlements. These are: –
Solan – Rajgarh road.
Solan – Subathu – Arki Road.
Solan – Kandaghat road via Basal and Salumana.
Solan – Jaunaji road.
Solan – Damrog – Jatoli road.
Solan – Ashwani Khad road. It connects Solan to Hart Village, the site of Mohan Shakti National Heritage Park. It will connect Chail ultimately.

By Road 
Solan is accessible by road as well as train. It is 68 kilometers from Chandigarh (2 hours journey by bus) and 48 kilometers from Shimla (1-hour journey by bus).

By Rail

The Kalka-Shimla Railway which is included in the UNESCO World Heritage List passes through Solan.
Solan is in the middle of this narrow-gauge line. Kalka-Shimla toy train halts at Solan railway station. It connects Kolkata, Delhi,  Mumbai, and other cities by connecting trains running from Kalka railway junction.

On Kalka-Shimla railway there are a total of 44 railway tunnels up to Solan.

By air

The nearest airport is Shimla airport which is about 45 km from solan. The Himachal Pradesh government is setting up its first international airport at an investment of Rs.1,000 crore in Solan district of the state on a public-private partnership model given the significance and pace of development that Solan has witnessed in recent times in the state of Himachal.
There is a helipad at Basal Road where helicopters of all the VIPs visiting Solan land.
Presently Chandigarh International Airport (Chandigarh Airport) is serving the air transportation needs of the residents of the town and tourists.

Sports
Badminton : There is an indoor badminton hall near the MC office.

Football at Thodo ground : Near MC Office, football and other sports activities are held in this ground.
An indoor stadium will come up in the city.
Gyms for fitness
Basketball at Police Ground

Infrastructure and health
ISBT Solan

There are two bus stands presently functioning in Solan city. One is the New bus stand which is below ITI Solan on the by-pass road which also is the main bus stand of the city. The other is known as the Old bus stand which is situated on The Mall and is used as the local bus stand.
Solan City also has a good intercity (Mudrika) bus service that connects the local areas of Solan city. Buses plying between Chandigarh-Shimla, Delhi-Shimla, and Nahan-Shimla halts at Solan. Free wifi facility is available at the Solan bus stand.

HRTC Solan
Himachal Road Transport Corporation Solan Depot came into existence on 1 November 1990 after shifting from Parwanoo. The depot is providing public transit facility to its passengers in the state of Himachal (rural and urban) and to the adjoining states and Union Territory like Chandigarh, Punjab, Haryana, Delhi, Uttar Pradesh, and Uttaranchal. Almost each and every part of the District. Solan is linked with roads. The HRTC Solan is running its buses covering Solan, Sirmour, Bilaspur, Shimla, Hamirpur, and Kangra districts of Himachal Pradesh. There is a huge network of HRTC to cater the needs of the commuters. Journey to various stations of Himachal has become easier than ever because of the huge network of HRTC buses. The HRTC Solan is running approximately 206 single routes, with the fleet of 83 buses and operating four types of buses:
Ordinary buses
High-Tech buses
City Bus (Mudrika)
Tata Air-conditioned bus
Solan depot is a pioneer in introducing Electronic Ticketing Machine, implementing Tally software & almost computerized for the following work.
 Monthly Review Data & its Analysis
 Route-wise Information
 Vehicle-wise Information
 Payroll
 Inventory
 Daily Monitoring System

Solid waste management

MC Solan has a well-organized network of solid waste collection & disposal. Waste is collected from 132 collection points with the help of 115 sanitation workers. Out of these 132 collection points, as many as 42 are the dumpers. The council has 2 placers and 1 tipper which is privately hired. It has 4 drivers. A total of 10 tons of solid waste is collected every day and transported to the waste recycling plant at Salogra. The plant is fully capable of meeting with the requirements of the town.

The waste recycling plant situated at Salogra is a unique thing in itself. Firstly it's only at Shimla and Solan that we have the waste recycling plants in Himachal Pradesh. Salogra plant has the distinction of being the first in HP It is till date being maintained by a non-government organization (NGO) known by the name of "Jan Seva Ashram" which has its head office in New Delhi. The plant has a land and processing plant capable of handling a total of up to 20 tons of solid waste. Presently on average, up to 10 tons of waste arrives here. On festival days the quantum reaches up to 13 tons. As and when a dumper placer or a tipper arrives from a unit, the constituents are segregated by the workers into polythene, stone, medical waste, paper, kitchen waste & such categories. Paper is recycled in the paper recycling plant. The organic waste is kept in open heaps which decomposes in a period of 40–45 days reducing it to compost. The other part of the waste being sanitary in nature is dumped on open land.
There are a number of facilities here. There is a JCB, a plant processor, soil testing & compost testing lab, and an office.

Health
State government Zonal hospital for primary and tertiary health care
Private clinics and hospitals for prophylactic and therapeutic health care.
Testing laboratories and imaging centers for diagnosis
Hospitals attached with medical and dental colleges
Ayurvedic Hospital

Education
The city is a hub of educational institutions and training centers. The various Primary and High schools of government and private bodies meet the needs of undergraduate students.

Private Schools

 St.Luke's School Solan 
 MRA DAV public School, Solan 
 B.L. Central public Sr. Sec. School, Solan, Shamti
 Dayanand Adarsh Vidalya Solan
 PNNM Geeta Adarsh Vidyalya, Solan 
 Durga Public School
 KK Blossoms High School
 Gurukul International School, solan
 Southvale the World School
 The Good Shepherd School
 Sanatan Dharam Senior Secondary School Solan
 Athena Public School, Solan
 Kidzee Solan

Central government
Urdu Teaching & Research Centre, Solan 
Dr. Yashwant Singh Parmar University of Horticulture and Forestry 

State government
Government Boys Senior Secondary School
Government Girls Senior Secondary School
Government PG College
Government Polytechnic College for Women
Industrial Training Institute

Private Universities

Shoolini University of Biotechnology & Management Sciences, Solan
Baddi University of Emerging Sciences and Technologies, Baddi, District. Solan
Bahara University Solan
Chitkara University, Himachal Pradesh, Barotiwala, District. Solan
Jaypee University of Information Technology, Waknaghat, District. Solan
Maharaja Agrasen University, District. Solan
Manav Bharti University, Kumarhatti, District. Solan

Two of these Universities, Shoolini University and Jaypee University, were ranked '100-150' among Universities in India in the National Institutional Ranking Framework (NIRF) in 2019

Private Dental Colleges
Bhojia dental college and hospital, Budh (Baddi) Dist. Solan
M.N.D.A.V. Dental College & Hospital, Solan

Private Medical College
MM University & Medical College, Solan District. Solan

Private Engineering College
Green Hills Engineering College, Kumarhatti, Solan
LR Group of Institute,Solan

Private GNM and other Nursing colleges
Murari Lal Memorial School & College of Nursing
Sai Sanjivini Hospital, Solan
Bhojia Institute Of Life Sciences, Nalagarh
Lord Mahavira B.sc Nursing College, Nalagarh
Murari Lal Memorial College Of Nursing, Nagali
Sai Sanjeevini Institute Of Medical Sciences
Awasthi Institute Of Nursing, Nalagarh

Homeopathic College
Solan Homeopathic Medical College, Barog Bypass, Kumarhatti.

Other Institution
TQM World Institution of Quality Excellence, Deoghat, Solan.

Motilal Nehru Central State Library
Motilal Nehru Central state library is situated on The Mall, Solan. Established on 29 June 1959, it is the only Central State Library in Himachal Pradesh. All the schools and public libraries in the state come under it. Till 1973 the library was running a certificate course in library science and had even initiated the Mobile Library project to benefit youth in rural areas of the state.

This library is Responsible for managing all school & public libraries in the state. There are thousands of precious and valuable books housed in this library. This library is centrally located above PNB on The Mall Solan.

Solan Library is a private library in Solan City. Library also runs a small cafe. It has theatre space which invites artists from all around India and the world.

Media
Divya Himachal  – Mera Solan News Paper
Dainik Data Sandesh  – Hindi Daily News Paper, Chambaghat Solan

Notable people
Rajeev Bindal – Speaker Himachal Pradesh Vidhan Sabha
Dhani Ram Shandil – Ex Member of Parliament
 Major Bikramjeet Kanwarpal is an Indian film and television actor
Ruhani Sharma is an Indian film actor

Gallery

References

External links

Official Site

 http://www.divyahimachal.com

 
Cities and towns in Solan district